is a Japanese manga series written and illustrated by . It started serialization in Jitsugyo no Nihon Sha's seinen magazine, Weekly Manga Sunday on November 15, 1988.

The manga was adapted into an original video animation by Tokyo Movie Shinsha. Directed by Hajime Kamegaki, it was released in Japan by Toho on April 12, 1991. It was made into a Japanese television drama series in 1994, into films in 2000 and 2009, and into a drama CD in 2010.

Manga
Jitsugyo no Nihon Sha released the first tankōbon volume of the manga on April 6, 1989. The last tankōbon, the 108th volume, was released on June 29, 2013. Jitsugyo no Nihon Sha re-released the manga in 16 bunkobon volumes between July 28, 2005, and June 25, 2006. The manga was licensed in Taiwan by Da Ran Culture up to volume 66 before it went bankrupt on March 31, 2003. Volumes 67 onwards were licensed by Sun Ho.

Reception
It has sold over 45 million copies in Japan as of 2016. In 2013, it won the Grand Prize of the 42nd Japan Cartoonists Association Award as the judges declared it was an important manga to support Weekly Manga Sunday and due to its "absurdity and fun."

References

External links
 Official list of Shizukanaru Don releases
 
 

1989 manga
1991 anime OVAs
Comedy anime and manga
Seinen manga
Jitsugyo no Nihon Sha manga
TMS Entertainment